Haraldur Sigurðsson  (born May 31, 1939) is an Icelandic volcanologist and geochemist.

Education
Sigurðsson studied geology and geochemistry in the United Kingdom, where he obtained a Bachelor of Science (BSc) degree from Queen's University, Belfast, followed by a PhD from Durham University in 1970.

Career and research
Sigurðsson worked on monitoring and research of the volcanoes of the Caribbean until 1974, when he was appointed professor at the Graduate School of Oceanography, University of Rhode Island.  He is best known for his work on the reconstruction of major volcanic eruptions of the past, including the eruption of Vesuvius in Italy in AD 79 and the consequent destruction of the Roman cities of Pompeii and Herculaneum. In 1991 he discovered tektite glass spherules at the Cretaceous–Paleogene boundary (K–T boundary) in Haiti, providing proof for a meteorite impact at the time of the extinction of the dinosaurs. In 2004 he discovered the lost town of Tambora in Indonesia, which was buried by the colossal 1815 explosive eruption of Tambora volcano. In 1999, Haraldur Sigurdsson published a scholarly account of the history of volcanology. He was also editor in chief of the Encyclopedia of Volcanoes, also published in 1999. He was awarded the Coke Medal of the Geological Society of London in 2004.

Active blogs
Haraldur Sigurdsson has in recent years been active in blogging in Icelandic on various issues related to his science, geology and geochemistry. There he has also been active in criticizing USA government, world capitalism  and activities of Chinese companies in the Arctic. He openly supports the left movement in USA. Sigurdsson has written on the Solarsilicon Project being developed by the US Company Silicor Materials Inc. in Iceland and its pollution. As well as other environmental issues including global warming.

Publications

References

Sigurdsson, Haraldur
Sigurdsson, Haraldur
Sigurdsson, Haraldur
Sigurdsson, Haraldur
Icelandic geochemists
Alumni of Durham University Graduate Society